is a railway station in the city of Toyokawa, Aichi, Japan, operated by Meitetsu.

Lines
Meiden Akasaka Station is served by the Meitetsu Nagoya Main Line and is 12.5 kilometers from the terminus of the line at Toyohashi Station.

Station layout
The station has two elevated opposed side platforms with the station building underneath. The station has automated ticket machines, Manaca automated turnstiles and is unattended.

Platforms

Adjacent stations

Station history
On 1 April 1935, the Aichi Electric Railway merged with the Nagoya Railroad (the forerunner of present-day Meitetsu). The station was renamed to its present name on 1 December 1938. The station has been unattended since 1971.

Passenger statistics
In fiscal 2017, the station was used by an average of 517 passengers daily.

Surrounding area
former Otowa Town Hall
 Akasaka-juku (Tōkaidō)

See also
 List of Railway Stations in Japan

References

External links

 Official web page 

Railway stations in Japan opened in 1926
Railway stations in Aichi Prefecture
Stations of Nagoya Railroad
Toyokawa, Aichi